The 1956 Taça de Portugal Final was the final match of the 1955–56 Taça de Portugal, the 16th season of the Taça de Portugal, the premier Portuguese football cup competition organized by the Portuguese Football Federation (FPF). The match was played on 27 May 1956 at the Estádio Nacional in Oeiras, and opposed two Primeira Liga sides: Porto and Torreense. Porto defeated Torreense 2–0 to claim their first Taça de Portugal.

Match

Details

References

1956
Taca
FC Porto matches